The Danjon scale is a five-point scale useful for measuring the appearance and luminosity of the Moon during a total lunar eclipse. It was proposed by André-Louis Danjon in 1921, when postulating that the brightness of a lunar eclipse was related to the solar cycle. An eclipse's rating on the scale is traditionally denoted by the letter L.

The scale
The Danjon scale is described in the following table:

Determining the value of L

Determination of the value of L for an eclipse is best done near mid-totality with the naked eye.  The scale is subjective, and different observers may determine different values.  In addition, different parts of the Moon may have different L values, depending on their distance from the center of the Earth's umbra.

Factors affecting the value of L

Many factors can affect the appearance of the Moon during a lunar eclipse.  The Moon's path through the Earth's umbra is important, but so too are the current conditions of the Earth's atmosphere.  While the Earth's shadow blocks any direct light from striking the Moon during a lunar eclipse, some light is refracted through the Earth's atmosphere giving the Moon a red hue.

The amount of light refracted affects the brightness of the moon at mid-eclipse, and this depends on several factors.  Volcanic eruptions are one of the most significant - eruptions which spew significant amounts of volcanic ash into the air are generally followed by several years of dark, deep red eclipses.  The effect of the 1991 eruption of Mount Pinatubo on subsequent lunar eclipses was very noticeable, with the eclipse of 9 December 1992 rated 0 on the Danjon Scale by many observers.

It is also thought that the solar cycle has some effect on the darkness of lunar eclipses--indeed Danjon established the scale for this reason.

References

External links
 https://web.archive.org/web/20050823095028/http://sunearth.gsfc.nasa.gov/eclipse/OH/Danjon.html

Lunar eclipses
Scales